Basco Airport (Filipino: Paliparan ng Basco, Ilocano: Pagtayaban ti Basco)  is an airport serving the province of Batanes in the Philippines.  It is located in the provincial capital, Basco, and is one of two airports in the Batanes Islands, the other being Itbayat Airport.  The airport is classified as a Class 2 principal (minor domestic) airport by the Civil Aviation Authority of the Philippines (CAAP), a body of the Department of Transportation that is responsible for the operations of not only this airport but also of all other airports in the Philippines except the major international airports.

The airport is one of the hubs of Sky Pasada.

Although the airport in the past was briefly served by international flights, the airport is not officially classified as an international airport.

Airlines and destinations

Statistics

Data from Civil Aviation Authority of the Philippines

Passenger movements

Aircraft movements

Cargo movements

See also
List of airports in the Philippines

References

Airports in the Philippines
Buildings and structures in Batanes